Yugoslavia competed at the 1984 Summer Paralympics in Stoke Mandeville, Great Britain and New York City, United States. 30 competitors from Yugoslavia won 32 medals including 11 gold, 10 silver and 11 bronze and finished 20th in the medal table.

See also 
 Yugoslavia at the Paralympics
 Yugoslavia at the 1984 Summer Olympics

References 

Yugoslavia at the Paralympics
Nations at the 1984 Summer Paralympics
1984 in Yugoslav sport